Samarokena (Samarkena, Karfasia, Tamaja ~ Tamaya) is a poorly documented Papuan language spoken in Indonesian Papua.

Samarokena is spoken in Karfasia, Maseb, Samarkena, and Tamaya villages.

Wurm (1975) linked it to the Kwerba languages, but Ross (2005) could not find enough evidence to classify it. Donahue (2002) found that the pronouns correspond closely to those of Airoran, though both are divergent from the Kwerba languages of the interior.

References

Clouse, Duane, Mark Donohue and Felix Ma. 2002. "Survey report of the north coast of Irian Jaya."

Languages of western New Guinea
Kwerbic languages